The B.Delta is a family of bulk cargo ships designed by Deltamarin.

Design
Generally, the B.Delta design has a relatively wide beam and shallow draft; with a combination of low fuel consumption and high deadweight.

The exact specification varies, but a recent order for handysize B.Delta37 carriers featured: 
 179.99m length
 30m beam
 10.5m Scantling draft
 17.6mt daily consumption at 14 knot service speed 
 38,500t deadweight
 50,000m³ cargo capacity

Other larger and smaller variants include the B.Delta25, B.Delta43, B.Delta64, B.Delta82 and B.Delta210.

Sales
The ships are built in several third-party shipyards following Deltamarin's design. Over 120 B.Delta ships have been ordered, including 21 orders for B.Delta37 ships built by Yangfang Shipyard.

References

Cargo ships